The KLIA Charter Field Town or KLIA Town Centre (Malay: Pusat Bandar KLIA) is a town centre within Kuala Lumpur International Airport (KLIA) in Sepang, Selangor, Malaysia. The town centre was established in 1993 during the construction of KLIA.

Facilities
Maybank
Caltex petrol station
Restoran Alimaju
The Zon (Duty free)

See also

Kuala Lumpur International Airport
Sepang District
Populated places in Selangor